Bafing Region is one of the 31 regions of Ivory Coast and is part of Woroba District. The region's seat is Touba. The region's area is 8,660 km², and its population in the 2021 census was 262,850.

Departments and geography
Bafing Region is currently divided into three departments: Koro, Ouaninou, and Touba. The region is traversed by a northwesterly line of equal latitude and longitude.

History
Bafing Region was created in 2000 as a first-level administration region of the country. It was formed by splitting-off Touba Department from Worodougou Region. Koro Department was created as a split-off from Touba Department in 2008.

As part of the 2011 reorganisation of the subdivisions of Ivory Coast, Bafing was converted into a second-level administrative region and was added to the new first-level Woroba District. No territorial changes were made to Bafing as a result of the reorganisation, but a third department—Ouaninou Department—was created by splitting Touba Department again.

Demographic change

Notes

 
Regions of Woroba District
2000 establishments in Ivory Coast
States and territories established in 2000